Nanna Vainio (born 29 May 1991) is a right handed Finnish badminton player who lives in Espoo in Finland. Since 2009 she has been the Finnish singles champion several times.

Career 
Vainio was born on Ekenäs in 1991. She first competed internationally in Latvia when she was 14 and she has been in the national team since 2008. She graduated from high school in Espoo Mattlidens gymnasium in 2010, after which she studied for a degree in information management and business administration at Loughborough University in England. In 2013, she moved to Copenhagen, where she studied for a master's degree and was trained by Anu Nieminen at the Copenhagen Badminton Center. She graduated in 2015 and has since been training again in Finland.

Vainio has been ranked as 56th in the world and she represented her country at the 2016 Summer Olympics. She lost in the first round of the tournament to the Spanish player Carolina Marín who has been ranked number one in the world.

Achievements

BWF International Challenge/Series 
Women's singles

  BWF International Challenge tournament
  BWF International Series tournament
  BWF Future Series tournament

References 

1991 births
Living people
Finnish female badminton players
Badminton players at the 2016 Summer Olympics
Olympic badminton players of Finland
Alumni of Loughborough University
People from Raseborg
Sportspeople from Uusimaa